Do Ab (also Romanized as Do Āb and Doāb; also known as Doābād) is a village in Oshnavieh-ye Jonubi Rural District, Nalus District, Oshnavieh County, West Azerbaijan Province, Iran. At the 2006 census, its population was 218, in 41 families.

References 

Populated places in Oshnavieh County